The Britons (*Pritanī), also known as Celtic Britons or Ancient Britons, were the people of Celtic language and culture who inhabited Great Britain from at least the British Iron Age until the High Middle Ages, at which point they diverged into the Welsh, Cornish and Bretons (among others). They spoke Common Brittonic, the ancestor of the modern Brittonic languages.
	
The earliest written evidence for the Britons is from Greco-Roman writers and dates to the Iron Age. Ancient Britain was made up of many tribes and kingdoms, associated with various hillforts. The Britons followed an Ancient Celtic religion overseen by druids. Some of the southern tribes had strong links with mainland Europe, especially Gaul and Belgica, and minted their own coins. The Roman Empire conquered most of Britain in the 1st century, creating the province of Britannia. The Romans invaded northern Britain, but the Britons and Caledonians in the north remained unconquered and Hadrian's Wall became the edge of the empire. A Romano-British culture emerged, mainly in the southeast, and British Latin coexisted with Brittonic. It is unclear what relationship the Britons had to the Picts, who lived outside the empire in northern Britain, though most scholars now accept that the Pictish language was closely related to Common Brittonic.

Following the end of Roman rule in Britain during the 5th century, Anglo-Saxon settlement of eastern and southern Britain began. The culture and language of the Britons fragmented, and much of their territory gradually became Anglo-Saxon, while the north became subject to a similar settlement by Gaelic speaking Scots from Ireland. The extent to which this cultural change was accompanied by wholesale population changes is still debated. During this time, Britons migrated to mainland Europe and established significant colonies in Brittany (now part of France), the Channel Islands, and Britonia (now part of Galicia, Spain). By the 11th century, Brittonic-speaking populations had split into distinct groups: the Welsh in Wales, the Cornish in Cornwall, the Bretons in Brittany, the Cumbrians of the Hen Ogledd ("Old North") in southern Scotland and northern England, and the remnants of the Pictish people in northern Scotland. Common Brittonic developed into the distinct Brittonic languages: Welsh, Cumbric, Cornish and Breton.

Name

In Celtic studies, 'Britons' refers to native speakers of the Brittonic languages in the ancient and medieval periods, "from the first evidence of such speech in the pre-Roman Iron Age, until the central Middle Ages".

The earliest known reference to the inhabitants of Britain was by Pytheas, a Greek geographer who made a voyage of exploration around the British Isles between 330 and 320 BC. Although none of his own writings remain, writers during the following centuries made much reference to them. The ancient Greeks called the people of Britain the Pretanoí or Bretanoí. Pliny's Natural History (77 AD) says the older name for the island was Albion, and Avienius calls it insula Albionum, "island of the Albions". The name could have reached Pytheas from the Gauls. The Latin name for the Britons was Britanni. 

The P-Celtic ethnonym has been reconstructed as *Pritanī, from Common Celtic *kʷritu, which became Old Irish cruth and Old Welsh pryd. This likely means "people of the forms", and could be linked to the Latin name Picti (the Picts), which is usually explained as meaning "painted people". The Old Welsh name for the Picts was Prydyn. Linguist Kim McCone suggests the name became restricted to inhabitants of the far north after Cymry displaced it as the name for the Welsh and Cumbrians. The Welsh prydydd, "maker of forms", was also a term for the highest grade of bard.

The medieval Welsh form of Latin Britanni was Brython (singular and plural). Brython was introduced into English usage by John Rhys in 1884 as a term unambiguously referring to the P-Celtic speakers of Great Britain, to complement Goidel; hence the adjective Brythonic referring to the group of languages. "Brittonic languages" is a more recent coinage (first attested 1923 according to the Oxford English Dictionary).

In the early Middle Ages, following Anglo-Saxon settlement of Britain, the Anglo-Saxons called all Britons Bryttas or Wealas (Welsh), while they continued to be called Britanni or Brittones in Medieval Latin. From the 11th century, they are more often referred to separately as the Welsh, Cumbrians, Cornish and Bretons, as they had separate political histories from then.

From the early 16th century, and especially after the Acts of Union 1707, the terms British and Briton could be applied to all inhabitants of the Kingdom of Great Britain, including the English, Scottish and some Irish, or the subjects of the British Empire generally.

Language

The Britons spoke an Insular Celtic language known as Common Brittonic. Brittonic was spoken throughout the island of Britain (in modern terms, England, Wales and Scotland), as well as offshore islands such as the Isle of Man, Isles of Scilly, Orkney, Hebrides, Isle of Wight and Shetland. According to early medieval historical tradition, such as The Dream of Macsen Wledig, the post-Roman Celtic-speakers of Armorica were colonists from Britain, resulting in the Breton language, a language related to Welsh and identical to Cornish in the early period and still used today. Thus the area today is called Brittany (Br. Breizh, Fr. Bretagne, derived from Britannia).

Common Brittonic developed from the Insular branch of the Proto-Celtic language that developed in the British Isles after arriving from the continent in the 7th century BC. The language eventually began to diverge; some linguists have grouped subsequent developments as Western and Southwestern Brittonic languages. Western Brittonic developed into Welsh in Wales and the Cumbric language in the Hen Ogledd or "Old North" of Britain (modern northern England and southern Scotland), while the Southwestern dialect became Cornish in Cornwall and South West England and Breton in Armorica. Pictish is now generally accepted to descend from Common Brittonic, rather than being a separate Celtic language. Welsh and Breton survive today; Cumbric and Pictish became extinct in the 12th century. Cornish had become extinct by the 19th century but has been the subject of language revitalization since the 20th century.

Tribal groups

Celtic Britain was made up of many territories controlled by Brittonic tribes. They are generally believed to have dwelt throughout the whole island of Great Britain, at least as far north as the Clyde–Forth isthmus. The territory north of this was largely inhabited by the Picts; little direct evidence has been left of the Pictish language, but place names and Pictish personal names recorded in the later Irish annals suggest it was indeed related to the Common Brittonic language. Their Goidelic (Gaelic) name, Cruithne, is cognate with Pritenī.

The following is a list of the major Brittonic tribes, in both the Latin and Brittonic languages, as well as their capitals during the Roman period.

Art

The La Tène style, which covers British Celtic art, was late arriving in Britain, but after 300 BC the Ancient British seem to have had generally similar cultural practices to the Celtic cultures nearest to them on the continent. There are significant differences in artistic styles, and the greatest period of what is known as the "Insular La Tène" style, surviving mostly in metalwork, was in the century or so before the Roman conquest, and perhaps the decades after it.

The carnyx, a trumpet with an animal-headed bell, was used by Celtic Britons during war and ceremony.

History

Origins
There are competing hypotheses for when Celtic peoples, and the Celtic languages, first arrived in Britain, none of which have gained consensus. The traditional view during most of the twentieth century was that Celtic culture grew out of the central European Hallstatt culture, from which the Celts and their languages reached Britain in the second half of the first millennium BC. More recently, John Koch and Barry Cunliffe have challenged that with their 'Celtic from the West' theory, which has the Celtic languages developing as a maritime trade language in the Atlantic Bronze Age cultural zone before it spread eastward. Alternatively, Patrick Sims-Williams criticises both of these hypotheses to propose 'Celtic from the Centre', which suggests Celtic originated in Gaul and spread during the first millennium BC, reaching Britain towards the end of this period.

In 2021, a major archaeogenetics study uncovered a migration into southern Britain during the Bronze Age, over a 500 year period from 1,300 BC to 800 BC. The migrants were "genetically most similar to ancient individuals from France" and had higher levels of Early European Farmers ancestry. From 1000 to 875 BC, their genetic marker swiftly spread through southern Britain, making up around half the ancestry of subsequent Iron Age people in this area, but not in northern Britain. The "evidence suggests that, rather than a violent invasion or a single migratory event, the genetic structure of the population changed through sustained contacts between mainland Britain and Europe over several centuries, such as the movement of traders, intermarriage, and small scale movements of family groups". The authors describe this as a "plausible vector for the spread of early Celtic languages into Britain". There was much less migration into Britain during the subsequent Iron Age, so it is more likely that Celtic reached Britain before then. Barry Cunliffe suggests that a branch of Celtic was already being spoken in Britain, and that the Bronze Age migration introduced the Brittonic branch.

The Anglo-Saxon Chronicle, which was originally compiled by the orders of King Alfred the Great in approximately 890, starts with this sentence: "The island Britain is 800 miles long, and 200 miles broad. And there are in the island five nations; English, Welsh (or British), Scottish, Pictish, and Latin. The first inhabitants were the Britons, who came from Armenia, and first peopled Britain southward" ("Armenia" is possibly a mistaken transcription of Armorica, an area in northwestern Gaul including modern Brittany).

Roman conquest

In 43 AD, the Roman Empire invaded Britain. The British tribes opposed the Roman legions for many decades, but by 84 AD the Romans had decisively conquered southern Britain and had pushed into Brittonic areas of what would later become northern England and southern Scotland. During the same period Belgic tribes from the Gaelic-Germanic borderlands settled in southern Britain. Caesar asserts the Belgae had first crossed the channel as raiders, only later establishing themselves on the island. 122 AD, the Romans fortified the northern border with Hadrian's Wall, which spanned what is now Northern England. In 142 AD, Roman forces pushed north again and began construction of the Antonine Wall, which ran between the Forth–Clyde isthmus, but they retreated back to Hadrian's Wall after only twenty years. Although the native Britons south of Hadrian's Wall mostly kept their land, they were subject to the Roman governors, whilst the Brittonic-Pictish Britons north of the wall probably remained fully independent and unconquered. The Roman Empire retained control of "Britannia" until its departure about AD 410, although parts of Britain had already effectively shrugged off Roman rule decades earlier.

Anglo-Saxon settlement of Britain  

Thirty years or so after the time of the Roman departure, the Germanic-speaking Anglo-Saxons began a migration to the south-eastern coast of Britain, where they began to establish their own kingdoms, and the Gaelic-speaking Scots migrating from Dál nAraidi (modern Northern Ireland) did the same on the west coast of Scotland and the Isle of Man.

At the same time, Britons established themselves in what is now called Brittany and the Channel Islands. There they set up their own small kingdoms and the Breton language developed from Brittonic Insular Celtic rather than Gaulish or Frankish. A further Brittonic colony, Britonia, was also set up at this time in Gallaecia in northwestern Spain.

Many of the old Brittonic kingdoms began to disappear in the centuries after the Anglo-Saxon and Scottish Gaelic invasions; Parts of the regions of modern East Anglia, East Midlands, North East England, Argyll and South East England were the first to fall to the Germanic and Gaelic Scots invasions.

The kingdom of Ceint (modern Kent) fell in 456 AD. Linnuis (which stood astride modern Lincolnshire and Nottinghamshire) was subsumed as early as 500 AD and became the English Kingdom of Lindsey.

Regni (essentially modern Sussex and eastern Hampshire) was likely fully conquered by 510 AD. Ynys Weith (Isle of Wight) fell in 530 AD, Caer Colun (essentially modern Essex) by 540 AD. The Gaels arrived on the northwest coast of Britain from Ireland, dispossessed the native Britons, and founded Dal Riata which encompassed modern Argyll, Skye and Iona between 500 and 560 AD. Deifr (Deira) which encompassed modern-day Teesside, Wearside, Tyneside, Humberside, Lindisfarne (Medcaut) and the Farne Islands fell to the Anglo-Saxons in 559 AD and Deira became an Anglo-Saxon kingdom after this point. Caer Went had officially disappeared by 575 AD becoming the Anglo-Saxon kingdom of East Anglia. Gwent was only partly conquered; its capital Caer Gloui (Gloucester) was taken by the Anglo-Saxons in 577 AD, handing Gloucestershire and Wiltshire to the invaders, while the westernmost part remained in Brittonic hands, and continued to exist in modern Wales.

Caer Lundein, encompassing London, St. Albans and parts of the Home Counties, fell from Brittonic hands by 600 AD, and Bryneich, which existed in modern Northumbria and County Durham with its capital of Din Guardi (modern Bamburgh) and which included Ynys Metcaut (Lindisfarne), had fallen by 605 AD becoming Anglo-Saxon Bernicia. Caer Celemion (in modern Hampshire and Berkshire) had fallen by 610 AD. Elmet, a large kingdom that covered much of modern Yorkshire, Lancashire and Cheshire and likely had its capital at modern Leeds, was conquered by the Anglo-Saxons in 627 AD. Pengwern, which covered Staffordshire, Shropshire, Herefordshire and Worcestershire, was largely destroyed in 656 AD, with only its westernmost parts in modern Wales remaining under the control of the Britons, and it is likely that Cynwidion, which had stretched from modern Bedfordshire to Northamptonshire, fell in the same general period as Pengwern, though a sub-kingdom of Calchwynedd may have clung on in the Chilterns for a time.

Novant, which occupied Galloway and Carrick, was soon subsumed by fellow Brittonic-Pictish polities by 700 AD. Aeron, which encompassed modern Ayrshire, was conquered by the Anglo-Saxon kingdom of Northumbria by 700 AD.

Yr Hen Ogledd (the Old North) 

Some Brittonic kingdoms were able to successfully resist these incursions: Rheged (encompassing much of modern Northumberland and County Durham and areas of southern Scotland and the Scottish Borders) survived well into the 8th century AD, before the eastern part peacefully joined with the Anglo-Saxon kingdom of Bernicia–Northumberland by 730 AD, and the west was taken over by the fellow Britons of Ystrad Clud. Similarly, the kingdom of Gododdin, which appears to have had its court at Din Eidyn (modern Edinburgh) and encompassed parts of modern Northumbria, County Durham, Lothian and Clackmannanshire, endured until approximately 775 AD before being divided by fellow Brittonic Picts, Gaelic Scots and Anglo-Saxons.

The Kingdom of Cait, covering modern Caithness, Sutherland, Orkney, and Shetland, was conquered by Gaelic Scots in 871 AD. Dumnonia (encompassing Cornwall, Devonshire and the Isles of Scilly) was partly conquered during the mid 9th century AD, with most of modern Devonshire being annexed by the Anglo-Saxons, but leaving Cornwall, the Isles of Scilly (Enesek Syllan), and for a time part of western Devonshire (including Dartmoor), still in the hands of the Britons, where they became the Brittonic state of Kernow. The Channel Islands (colonised by Britons in the 5th century) came under attack from Norse and Danish Viking attack in the early 9th century AD, and by the end of that century had been conquered by Viking invaders.

The Kingdom of Ce, which encompassed modern Marr, Banff, Buchan, Fife, and much of Aberdeenshire, disappeared soon after 900 AD. Fortriu, the largest Brittonic-Pictish kingdom which covered Strathearn, Morayshire and Easter Ross, had fallen by approximately 950 AD to the Gaelic Kingdom of Alba (Scotland). Other Pictish kingdoms such as Circinn (in modern Angus and The Mearns), Fib (modern Fife), Fidach (Inverness and Perthshire), and Ath-Fotla (Atholl), had also all fallen by the beginning of the 11th century AD or shortly after.

The Brythonic languages in these areas were eventually replaced by the Old English of the Anglo-Saxons, and Scottish Gaelic, although this was likely a gradual process in many areas.

Similarly, the Brittonic colony of Britonia in northwestern Spain appears to have disappeared soon after 900 AD.

The kingdom of Ystrad Clud (Strathclyde) was a large and powerful Brittonic kingdom of the Hen Ogledd (the 'Old North') which endured until the end of the 11th century, successfully resisting Anglo-Saxon, Gaelic Scots and later also Viking attacks. At its peak it encompassed modern Strathclyde, Dumbartonshire, Cumbria, Stirlingshire, Lanarkshire, Ayrshire, Dumfries and Galloway, Argyll and Bute, and parts of North Yorkshire, the western Pennines, and as far as modern Leeds in West Yorkshire. Thus the Kingdom of Strathclyde became the last of the Brittonic kingdoms of the 'old north' to fall in the 1090s when it was effectively divided between England and Scotland.

Wales, Cornwall and Brittany 

The Britons also retained control of Wales and Kernow (encompassing Cornwall, parts of Devon including Dartmoor, and the Isles of Scilly) until the mid 11th century AD when Cornwall was effectively annexed by the English, with the Isles of Scilly following a few years later, although at times Cornish lords appear to have retained sporadic control into the early part of the 12th century AD.

Wales remained free from Anglo-Saxon, Gaelic Scots and Viking control, and was divided among varying Brittonic kingdoms, the foremost being Gwynedd (including Clwyd and Anglesey), Powys, Deheubarth (originally Ceredigion, Seisyllwg and Dyfed), Gwent, and Morgannwg (Glamorgan). These Brittonic-Welsh kingdoms initially included territories further east than the modern borders of Wales; for example, Powys included parts of modern Merseyside, Cheshire and the Wirral and Gwent held parts of modern Herefordshire, Worcestershire, Somerset and Gloucestershire, but had largely been confined to the borders of modern Wales by the beginning of the 12th century.

However, by the early 1100s, the Anglo-Saxons and Gaels had become the dominant cultural force in most of the formerly Brittonic ruled territory in Britain, and the language and culture of the native Britons was thereafter gradually replaced in those regions, remaining only in Wales, Cornwall, the Isles of Scilly and Brittany, and for a time in parts of Cumbria, Strathclyde, and eastern Galloway.

Cornwall (Kernow, Dumnonia) had certainly been largely absorbed by England by the 1050s to early 1100s, although it retained a distinct Brittonic culture and language. Britonia in Spanish Galicia seems to have disappeared by 900 AD.

Wales and Brittany remained independent for a considerable time, however, with Brittany united with France in 1532, and Wales united with England by the Laws in Wales Acts 1535–1542 in the mid 16th century during the rule of the Tudors (Y Tuduriaid), who were themselves of Welsh heritage on the male side.

Wales, Cornwall, Brittany and the Isles of Scilly continued to retain a distinct Brittonic culture, identity and language, which they have maintained to the present day. The Welsh and Breton languages remain widely spoken, and the Cornish language, once close to extinction, has experienced a revival since the 20th century. The vast majority of place names and names of geographical features in Wales, Cornwall, the Isles of Scilly and Brittany are Brittonic, and Brittonic family and personal names remain common.

During the 19th century, many Welsh farmers migrated to Patagonia in Argentina, forming a community called Y Wladfa, which today consists of over 1,500 Welsh speakers.

In addition, a Brittonic legacy remains in England, Scotland and Galicia in Spain, in the form of often large numbers of Brittonic place and geographical names. Examples of geographical Brittonic names survive in the names of rivers, such as the Thames, Clyde, Severn, Tyne, Wye, Exe, Dee, Tamar, Tweed, Avon, Trent, Tambre, Navia, and Forth. Many place names in England and Scotland are of Brittonic rather than Anglo-Saxon or Gaelic origin, such as London, Manchester, Glasgow, Edinburgh, Carlisle, Caithness, Aberdeen, Dundee, Barrow, Exeter, Lincoln, Dumbarton, Brent, Penge, Colchester, Gloucester, Durham, Dover, Kent, Leatherhead, and York.

Genetics

Schiffels et al. (2016) examined the remains of three Iron Age Britons buried ca. 100 BC. A female buried in Linton, Cambridgeshire carried the maternal haplogroup H1e, while two males buried in Hinxton both carried the paternal haplogroup R1b1a2a1a2, and the maternal haplogroups K1a1b1b and H1ag1. Their genetic profile was considered typical for Northwest European populations. Though sharing a common Northwestern European origin, the Iron Age individuals were markedly different from later Anglo-Saxon samples, who were closely related to Danes and Dutch people.

Martiano et al. (2016) examined the remains of a female Iron Age Briton buried at Melton between 210 BC and 40 AD. She was found to be carrying the maternal haplogroup U2e1e. The study also examined seven males buried in Driffield Terrace near York between the 2nd century AD and the 4th century AD during the period of Roman Britain. Six of these individuals were identified as native Britons. The six examined native Britons all carried types of the paternal R1b1a2a1a, and carried the maternal haplogroups H6a1a, H1bs, J1c3e2, H2, H6a1b2 and J1b1a1. The indigenous Britons of Roman Britain were genetically closely related to the earlier Iron Age female Briton, and displayed close genetic links to modern Celts of the British Isles, particularly Welsh people, suggesting genetic continuity between Iron Age Britain and Roman Britain, and partial genetic continuity between Roman Britain and modern Britain. On the other hand, they were genetically substantially different from the examined Anglo-Saxon individual and modern English populations of the area, suggesting that the Anglo-Saxon settlement of Britain left a profound genetic impact.

See also

 Albion
 Bretons
 British Latin
 Celtic nations
 Celtic language decline in England
 Cornish people
 Cumbric
 English people
 Fortriu
 Genetic history of the British Isles
 Gododdin
 History of the British Isles
 Kingdom of Cat
 Kingdom of Ce
 Kingdom of Strathclyde
 List of Celtic tribes
 Scottish people
 Welsh people
 Yr Hen Ogledd

References

Bibliography

External links

BBC – History – Native Tribes of Britain
DNA from ethnic Britons found in Ireland
Scottish Archaeological Research Framework (ScARF) 

 
Historical Celtic peoples
Iron Age Britain
Ancient Britain
Ethnic groups in Scotland